"We Got Hood Love" (or simply "Hood Love") is a song performed by American R&B recording artist Mary J. Blige and features American singer Trey Songz. It was released as the third American (fourth overall) and last single from her ninth studio album, Stronger with Each Tear. The song was originally sung with Blige & Johnta Austin.

Music video
A video was shot with Mary J. Blige and football player George Wilson in Miami, while Trey Songz shot his scenes in a New York City apartment. The video focuses on three couples who personify the definition of "Hood Love". Chris Robinson directed the video for the song. The video which although was originally scheduled to premiere on May 10, 2010 through Vevo actually appeared on Rap-Up on May 6, 2010.

Chart performance

Radio adds

References

Mary J. Blige songs
Songs written by Mary J. Blige
Contemporary R&B ballads
2010 singles
Songs written by Johntá Austin
Music videos directed by Chris Robinson (director)
Trey Songz songs
2009 songs
Songs written by Bryan-Michael Cox
Geffen Records singles
Songs written by Kendrick Dean
Soul ballads
2000s ballads
Song recordings produced by Bryan-Michael Cox